Sosanpal is a town in Bastar district, Chhattisgarh, India.

Geography

Location
Sosanpal is connected to Jagdalpur, which is 14 km away, by National Highway 221. Nearest airport is Raipur Airport.
sosanpal me mukhya rup se dekha ja skta dimrapal

Places of interest
 Indravati National Park
 Kanger Ghati National Park
 Chitrakot Waterfalls

References

External links
 About Sosanpal
 Satellite image of Sosanpal

Cities and towns in Bastar district